Ale is a fermented alcoholic beverage.

Ale or ALE may also refer to:

Music
Ale (album), 2008 album by Italian singer Alexia
Ale (Polish for "But"), a 2012 album by Dorota Miśkiewicz
"Ale", a song by Xiu Xiu from La Forêt

People

Mononym
Ale the Strong, legendary Scandinavian ruler
Onela, or Åle or Ale, mythological Swedish king 
Ale Pyinthe (Saw Rahan II), a queen consort in the Pagan Dynasty of Myanmar

Given name
Alê Abreu (born 1971), Brazilian film director and screenwriter
Ale Ahmad Suroor, Urdu poet, critic and professor from India
Ale de Boer (born 1987), Dutch football player
Ale Dee, real name Alexandre Duhaime, Canadian rapper 
Alé Garza (born 1977), American penciler and comics artist
Ale González (born 1994), Spanish football player
Ale Möller (born 1955), Swedish musician and composer
Ale Smidts (born 1958), Dutch organizational theorist

Surname
Ale Vena Ale, Samoan politician
Arnold Ale (born 1970), American football player
Savali Talavou Ale, American Samoan politician

Places
Ale (woreda), Oromia Region, Ethiopia
Ale Municipality, Västra Götaland, Sweden
Ale Hundred, Västergötland, Sweden

ALE as an abbreviation or code
ale, ISO 939-2/3 language code for Aleut language
 .ale, filename extension for Avid Log Exchange file format
Annualized loss expectancy, in financial risk
Apple Lossless Encoder, an audio coding format
Arbitrary Lagrangian Eulerian, a material point method numerical technique
Asymptotically locally Euclidean, a division of gravitational instanton 
Automatic link establishment, an HF radio standard
Application Level Events, an EPC/RFID standard

Other uses
ALE (company) a heavy transport and lifting company
Ala (demon), plural ale, mythological creatures of the Bulgarians, Macedonians, and Serbs 
 Ale, a party for English morris dance sides
Ale, a fish in the American television series FishCenter Live
 Ale language, a language of Ethiopia
 Wailapa language, also known as Ale, a language of Vanuatu

See also
Ginger ale, a carbonated soft drink flavoured with ginger
Parish ale, an English festivity at which ale was the chief drink